Alan K. Campbell (February 21, 1904 – June 14, 1963) was an American writer, stage actor, and screenwriter. He and his wife, Dorothy Parker, were a popular screenwriting team in Hollywood from 1934 to 1963.

Life and career
Born in Richmond, Virginia, he was the only child of Harry L. Campbell and his wife Hortense Eichel Campbell. He graduated from the Virginia Military Institute and moved to New York City in the late 1920s. An occasional contributor of prose to The New Yorker, he also acted on the Broadway stage. He met Dorothy Parker in 1932 and they married two years later in Raton, New Mexico. Like Parker, he was of Scottish and German-Jewish descent.

Campbell, Parker, and their collaborator, Robert Carson, earned an Academy Award nomination for Best Adapted Screenplay for 1937's A Star Is Born. He and Parker also wrote additional dialogue for The Little Foxes when Lillian Hellman was called away to work on another project.

In 1942, Campbell enlisted in the U.S. Army in Philadelphia. He was commissioned a captain, and served in Army Intelligence in Europe for the duration of World War II. Campbell and Parker divorced in 1947, then remarried in 1950. Although they lived separately from 1952 until 1961, they remained married until Campbell's death.

Campbell died of an apparent suicide on June 14, 1963, in West Hollywood, California. While Parker insisted that he would never have intentionally killed himself, and reported his death as "accidental", he had been drinking all day; capsules of the barbiturate Seconal were found around his bed, and a plastic bag was draped over his neck and shoulders. The coroner's report listed the cause of death as "acute barbiturate poisoning due to an ingestion of overdose". His remains were returned to Richmond for burial and he is buried at Hebrew Cemetery (Richmond, Virginia).

Film portrayal
Campbell was portrayed by Hal Holbrook in the 1977 film Julia and by Peter Gallagher in the 1994 film Mrs. Parker and the Vicious Circle.

Partial filmography
 The Moon's Our Home (1936)
 Lady Be Careful (1936)
 Three Married Men (1936)
 A Star Is Born (1937)
 Sweethearts (1938)
 Trade Winds (1938)
 The Little Foxes (1941)
 Week-End for Three (1941)
 Tales of Manhattan (1942)
 Woman on the Run (1950)
 A Star Is Born (1954)

References

External links

American male screenwriters
Burials at Hebrew Cemetery (Richmond, Virginia)
Writers from Richmond, Virginia
Male actors from Virginia
1904 births
1963 deaths
Drug-related suicides in California
United States Army officers
Virginia Military Institute alumni
20th-century American male actors
Screenwriters from Virginia
American people of Scottish descent
American people of German-Jewish descent
20th-century American male writers
20th-century American screenwriters
Alcohol-related deaths in California
United States Army personnel of World War II
1963 suicides